"The Promise of a New Day" is the second single (and lead-off track) from American artist Paula Abdul's album Spellbound. The song was written by Paula Abdul, Peter Lord and V. Jeffrey Smith.  The single was released to radio while the hit "Rush Rush" was still at the top of radio airplay and the pop charts. It is an upbeat pop song that lyrically finds the singer feeling optimistic about a relationship as well as the lives of future generations.

Chart performance
"The Promise of a New Day" debuted at  40 on the US Billboard Hot 100 chart, the week ending July 20, 1991, claiming the spot of Hot Shot Debut. The following week, the single climbed to No. 26, with this week claiming the Greatest Airplay Gainer. The song reached No. 1 on the chart on September 14, 1991 and ended the reign of Bryan Adams' long-running No. 1 hit, "Everything I Do (I Do It For You)". The following week, it fell to No. 5, and departed the top 40 only four weeks later. It was Abdul's sixth chart-topping single, and her last No. 1 single to date.

Music video
The video, directed by Big TV! (Andy Delaney and Monty Whitebloom) was shot during the week of July 8, 1991. Filming took place in two different locations with backgrounds for the video being shot in Hawaii, with Abdul and her backup dancers being filmed separately on a sound stage and later composited through blue screen. Abdul was unable to attend filming in Hawaii due to prior commitments.

Charts

Weekly charts

Year-end charts

Release history

References

1991 singles
1991 songs
Billboard Hot 100 number-one singles
Cashbox number-one singles
Music videos directed by Big T.V.
Paula Abdul songs
Songs written by Paula Abdul
Songs written by Sandra St. Victor
Virgin Records singles